Crispin Narciso Lupas Salvador is a fictional character created by Miguel Syjuco.

Literary Character
Crispin Salvador is a main character in Syjuco's novel Ilustrado. Crispin Salvador's existence has been believed to be real by various readers of Ilustrado — a book comprising excerpted work by Salvador (memoirs, stories, interviews, essays, poems, jokes, etc.).

References

Literary forgeries
Fictional writers